Climăuții de Jos is a commune in Șoldănești District, Moldova. It is composed of two villages, Climăuții de Jos and Cot.

References

Communes of Șoldănești District
Populated places on the Dniester